Delvinta is an unincorporated community in Lee County, Kentucky, United States.

The retired post office was established in 1898. Delvinta was named by the spouse of the first postmaster, who was an avid vintner, meaning "a place of vines".

References

Unincorporated communities in Lee County, Kentucky
Unincorporated communities in Kentucky